Antrigoulia is an extinct genus of palaeospinacid shark from the Cretaceous period. It is named after a farm in the vicinity of the type locality called Mas d’Antrigoule. It is known from a single species consisting of isolated teeth from the Valanginian of France, A. circumplicata. The name is derived from the concentric folds on the labial side of its teeth.

References

Palaeospinacidae
Prehistoric cartilaginous fish genera